Semljicola angulatus is a spider species found in Scandinavia, Russia, Mongolia and Sakhalin.

See also 
 List of Linyphiidae species (Q–Z)

References 

Linyphiidae
Spiders of Europe
Spiders of Asia
Spiders described in 1963